The Uruguay national handball team is the national handball team of Uruguay. It takes part in international handball competitions.

Results

World Championship

Pan American Games

Pan American Championship

South and Central American Championship

Other competitions

Friendly tournaments
2017 Four Nations Tournament – 3rd

Current squad
Squad for the 2023 World Men's Handball Championship.

Head coach: Nicolás Guerra

Junior team

World Junior Championship

Pan American Junior Championship
1993 – 
1997 – 
2005 – 4th
2007 – 4th

References

External links

IHF profile

Handball in Uruguay
Men's national handball teams
National sports teams of Uruguay